The 2010 Yonex-Sunrise India Open Grand Prix Gold was a badminton BWF Grand Prix Gold event, which held between June 8–13, 2010 at the Jawaharlal Nehru Stadium (Chennai), India.

Winners

Finals

References

tournamentsoftware.com

India Open (badminton)
India Open
2010 in Indian sport